Grattan Township may refer to the following places in the United States:

 Grattan Township, Michigan
 Grattan Township, Itasca County, Minnesota
 Grattan Township, Holt County, Nebraska

Township name disambiguation pages